Nya spår is the fifth studio album by Swedish dansband Arvingarna, released in November 1997. The album peaked at number 41 on the Swedish Albums Chart.

Track listing
Pamela
Låt oss tala känslor
Jag drar iväg
Det kan ingen ändra på
Blå är min himmel
Sommarliv
Drömmen om en frihet
En dag i taget
Små paket
De ensammas promenad
Gud, vad hon är läcker
Om dessa väggar kunde tala
Stan é för stor för oss två
Vilken härlig dag
Månen är kvar
Go go Jenny

Charts

References

1997 albums
Arvingarna albums